North Pontianak (Indonesian: Pontianak Utara) is a district (Indonesian:kecamatan) of the city of Pontianak. It lies on the north bank of the Kapuas Besar River (west of the confluence to between the Kapuas Kecil River and the Landak River, which join to form the Kapuas Besar River) and covers an area of 37.22 km2. It had a population of 112,577 at the 2010 census; the latest official estimate of population (as at mid 2019) is 130,344. This is the largest district by area and also the district with lowest population density in Pontianak.

List of famous places in North Pontianak:
 The Equator monument
 Khatulistiwa golf course
 Pontianak Aloe Vera Center
 Pontianak Sultanate cemetery
 Batu Layang bus terminal
 Puring traditional market
 Institute Dayakologi 
 Poltekes Pontianak

References

Pontianak
Populated places in West Kalimantan